XXXV Brigade, Royal Field Artillery was a brigade of the Royal Field Artillery which served in the First World War.

It was stationed in Eastern Command in the United Kingdom on mobilisation in August 1914, and was attached to 7th Division and sent to the Continent in September. It saw service with the division on the Western Front throughout the war.

It was originally formed with 12th, 25th and 58th Batteries, with 31st (Howitzer) Battery joining in May 1916.

External links
Royal Field Artillery Brigades
7th Division order of battle
The British Army: 1914, Mark Conrad, 1996. (on archive.org)

Notes

References

Royal Field Artillery brigades
Artillery units and formations of World War I